XHPTLA-FM is a radio station on 104.7 FM in San Andrés Tuxtla, Veracruz. It is known as Mezkla FM.

History
XHPTLA was awarded in the IFT-4 radio auction of 2017 and came to air on February 2, 2018. Mezkla is owned by Rafael Fararoni Mortera, a local beer distributor and politician.

References

Radio stations in Veracruz
Radio stations established in 2018
2018 establishments in Mexico